Canela (pronounced Kuh-NAY-luh) is an American R&B singer and songwriter. She is best known in the mixtape circuit for her DJ Clue-remixed song, "Sponsor", and for co-writing Anastacia's worldwide top 20 hit, "Why'd You Lie to Me". She once recorded an album in 2001, however it was shelved after her label folded.

Biography

Early life
Canela Cox was born in Los Angeles, California.  She moved to Amsterdam (Holland, Europe) at the age of 12 where her mother, a former Diana Ross' background vocalist, Rocq-E Harrell performed as an R&B singer and recording artist. Upon moving back to the United States at age 18, Canela continued to pursue her musical endeavors performing with numerous musical groups throughout Los Angeles.

2000 – 2001
In 2000, Canela was featured on Jennifer Lopez's multi-plantinum selling single, "Love Don't Cost a Thing". Though Canela was uncredited for her work on Lopez's song, she performed as Lopez's background vocalist for numerous tours and new songs. While performing with Lopez at a Los Angeles concert, her talent was recognized by Rodney Jerkins, who brought her to DreamWorks Records' attention, and was immediately signed to the label in 2001.

In early 2001, Canela began to record for her self-titled debut album, which featured production by Darkchild, Tim & Bob, Lil' Mo, Fred Jerkins III, Brycyn Evans, & DJ Clue. She and DreamWorks announced at the time that it would be released sometime in December 2001.

Her buzz single, "Sponsor", was released to radio in March 2001 during the process of the recording for her album. In addition to its release, a DJ Clue remix, featuring Fabolous, was released to mixtape circuits, which received heavy underground play. Both versions of the single, however, failed to chart.

Months following the failure of Canela's previous single, "Everything", produced by Darkchild, was released to radio as the official lead single for her debut. A music video was shot for the song, and was able to be viewed on BET's 106 & Park. However, "Everything" suffered the same failure as her buzz single. Because her single failed to chart, DreamWorks Records put a halt on Canela's debut.

In December 2001, just days before Canela's debut was to be released, DreamWorks Records was bought by Universal Music Group, which caused the label to fold, thus her debut was shelved.

2002 – 2004
Months after Canela dispersed from DreamWorks Records, Canela co-wrote Anastacia's 2002 single "Why'd You Lie to Me". She was also the female vocalist on rapper Won G's 2004 single "Caught Up in the Rapture".

In 2004, Canela was signed to Genuine Entertainment (in conjunction with Monopoly Records); there, Canela began recording for another album. Its buzz singles, "Blazed" and "Bedrock", were released through Monopoly Records in 2004, however neither single managed to chart. Because of lack of promotion and failed attempts to put out a single properly, Canela left Monopoly Records, and began singing and songwriting for other artists.

2005–present
In 2005, Canela was featured as a background vocalist for the soundtrack to Coach Carter. Canela was also featured on rapper, Ak'Sent's "Pick Up" the following year. Though the single failed to chart, it became an online success for both Canela & Ak'Sent.

Months following Canela's success, she provided vocals for Disney Channel Soundtracks for High School Musical 2, The Proud Family, Jump In, & Cheetah Girls 2.

In 2006, Canela joined pop band, Anything but Monday; the group was featured in the reality show "30 Days 'til I'm Famous" and has yet to release a debut album which has been delayed several times.

In 2007, it was announced that Canela had rejoined her former Indie label, Monopoly Records.

That same year, she began recording new material for her new album. She released the buzz single, "I'll C U Later" in early 2007, and went on to release two more ("I Want U for Me" & "Kiss 'N Tell") a year later.

Currently, Canela is still recording for the album, and is writing for several artists, as well as performing numerous demo tracks for other artists.

Discography

Albums

Singles
 2001: "Sponsor"
 2001: "Everything"
 2004: "Caught Up in the Rapture" (Won-G feat. Canela Cox)
 2004: "Blazed"
 2004: "Bedrock" 1
 2006: "Pick Up" (Ak'Sent feat. Canela Cox)
 2007: "I'll C U Later"
 2008: "Kiss 'N Tell"
 2008: "I Want U for Me"

1 later re-recorded by Ak'Sent & re-released in 2006

References

External links 
 
 Canela on Discogs
 

American contemporary R&B singers
20th-century African-American women singers
Living people
1984 births
21st-century American singers
21st-century African-American musicians
21st-century African-American women